The Columbia Mall is an enclosed 282,272 square foot shopping mall located in Columbia, Tennessee that opened in 1981 originally as the Shadybrook Mall. Goody's, one of the anchors, closed in early 2017. On June 4, 2020, JCPenney, the only other anchor, announced that it would close by around October 2020 as part of a plan to close 154 stores nationwide. In 2012, a medical center was built at the mall.

References

External links

Buildings and structures in Columbia, Tennessee
Shopping malls in Tennessee
Shopping malls established in 1981
Hull Property Group
1981 establishments in Tennessee